Sawamura (written: 沢村 or 澤村) is a Japanese surname. Notable people with the surname include:

 (1917–1944), Japanese baseball player
 (born 1988), Japanese Nippon Professional Baseball player
Ikki Sawamura (沢村 一樹) (born 1967) Japanese actor
 (1905–1974), Japanese actor
 (1943–2021), Japanese kickboxer

Fictional characters:
Chizuru Sawamura of Inubaka
Haruka Sawamura of Yakuza (series)
Seiji Sawamura and his sister Rin of Midori Days
Daichi Sawamura of Haikyuu!
Dai Sawamura of Space Sherrif Shaider
Eijun Sawamura of Diamond no Ace

Japanese-language surnames